The Ragigudda Sree Prasanna Anjaneyaswamy Temple, commonly referred to as Ragigudda Temple or Ragigudda Anjaneya Temple is a temple dedicated to Lord Hanuman, spread across 5 acres also having a hillock in Jayanagara 9th Block suburb of Bengaluru, Karnataka, India. The temple also houses a Shivalinga along with Lord Rama, Goddess Sita, Lord Lakshmana along with the main deity of Lord Hanuman in the same precinct. The temple is on a hillock. There is a smaller temple dedicated to Lord Ganesha, Navagrahas and the Goddess Rajarajeshwari at the base of the hillock. It also plays host a Thrimurthy Sannidhi to the Hindu holy trinity of Lord Brahma, Lord Vishnu and Lord Shiva on huge engraved rocks at the side of the temple.

Currently Bengaluru's Namma Metro work is underway a few 100m from the temple with a Yellow Line Metro station planned as well.

History 
It is believed that the hillock or Gudda in Kannada language that hosts the main deity Sri Prasanna Anjaneya Swamy was formed from a heap of Finger Millet or Ragi and hence was termed "Ragigudda". Local mythology has it that this place owes it to a dharmic lady Sudharma who was the wife of a local chieftain. She is an embodiment of good character and a very pious. One day the trinity comes in the form of visitors and asks for bhiksha (alms). She gives them newly harvested Raghava Dhanya or Ragi. Her mother-in-law disapproves of it and wants it back. This being an unholy act she says that if the visitors do not want the bhiksha then she does not need the Ragi. This Ragi becomes a hillock. In the end, the holy trinity is pleased with her selfless behaviour and grants her their sacred darshan. The holy trinity expressed their will to remain near the hillock and turned themselves into stones nearby. These three stones now bear the engravings of the trinity.

The temple was formed in 1969 and registered in 1972.

Culture 
Over the past decades, this temple has become the social centre in this locality. It has a charitable arm that provides affordable education and healthcare to the less privileged in and around the temple. The schools provide education till the 10th standard in Karnataka State Secondary Education Examination Board in both Kannada and English medium. The temple also provides healthcare services through Sanjeevini Arogya Tapasana Kendra and Yoga classes for devotees. Free tuition classes are held for graduate students. It also has a Kalyana Mantapa (Hindu Marriage Hall) that is budget conscious while providing the necessary services. It also has a Goshale (cowshed) that provides milk for the pooja and the students.

In December every year, the festival of Shree Hanuman Jayanthi (the auspicious birth anniversary of Lord Hanuman) is celebrated as a 12-day event in grandeur at the temple with over 35,000 pilgrims attending the festivities. A lot of yagyas, abhisheka and poojas are carried out with the Mahaprasada being served to thousands of devotees. The temple allows its devotees to work as volunteers for various activities. Hundreds of youngsters participate in various activities from crowd management to providing devotees with prasad. During this period there is a big fair in and around the temple and it acts as a livelihood for hundreds of families in South Bengaluru.

Timings

Monday to Friday 
Morning 8.00 am to 11.30 am

Evening 5.00 pm to 8.00 pm

Saturday and Sunday 
Morning 8.00 am to 12.30 pm

Evening 5.00 pm to 8.30 pm

Mahamangalarathi 
Saturday 11:00 am to 11:30 am & 8:00 pm to 8:30 pm

Gallery

References

External links 
 Short trip to Ragigudda temple
 
 Temple seva details

Hindu temples in Bangalore
Hanuman temples